The State 8 is a peakbagging list of the highest peaks in each of Australia's states:
Mount Kosciuszko in New South Wales
Mount Bogong in Victoria
Bimberi Peak in the Australian Capital Territory
Mount Ossa in Tasmania
Mount Bartle Frere in Queensland
Mount Zeil in the Northern Territory
Ngarutjaranya in South Australia
Mount Meharry in Western Australia

References

Mountains of Australia
Lists of landforms of Australia
Lists of mountains by prominence
Mountains of Australia by state or territory